The AMD Alarus CH2000 is a two-seat, fixed tricycle gear general aviation airplane, used primarily for flight training, that was designed by Chris Heintz. It is manufactured by Aircraft Manufacturing and Design Co. in Eastman, Georgia. It is a low-wing aircraft, with one door located above each wing, respectively. It can be considered a competitor to similar aircraft used for flight training, such as the Diamond DA20.

The Alarus features Garmin avionics and a  cabin.

As of 2011 the aircraft is no longer in production by AMD, although Zenair provides parts support.

Variants
The Alarus was offered in two variants: the AMD Alarus CH2000 general aviation aircraft and the SAMA CH2000 Military Tactical Surveillance Aircraft (MTSA).

SAMA CH2000
The SAMA CH2000 is a military surveillance variant of the Alarus.  It is equipped with forward-looking infrared – a multi sensor imager offering high performance, precision and high level imaging.

The aircraft is also equipped with state-of-the-art communications systems for secure air-to-air and air-to-ground communications and is equipped for day and night missions. The aircraft is manufactured in Amman, Jordan and Baghdad, Iraq.

The United States Army acquired 8 aircraft at a cost of USD$5.8M for the Iraqi Air Force in 2004, and the first two SAMA CH2000s were delivered on 18 January 2005. The first four CH2000s were used by the 3rd Squadron, based at Kirkuk Air Base, and the others by the 70th Squadron at Basra International Airport. In 2008, following the service entry of the Cessna 208 in the Iraqi Air Force, SAMA CH2000s used by the 3rd Squadron were transferred to the 70th Squadron.

Zenair CH 640

The four seat kit aircraft derivative of the Alarus is the Zenair CH 640.

Operators
The Alarus is used by some flight schools in the United States.

In February 2008 there were 113 CH2000 Alarus registered in the USA and four in Canada.

The first military user of the CH2000 was the Iraqi Air Force, currently operating 8 aircraft. 

The Peruvian Air Force will receive six CH2000s built under licence by SEMAN with some custom modifications. The Peruvian version is called the Antarqui (which was a special elite of Chasqui messengers in service with the Inca Empire, that are believed to have used a paragliding device to jump from one hill to another).

Military operators

Iraqi Air Force - 70th Squadron

Peruvian Air Force

Specifications

See also

References

External links

 Company website archives on Archive.org

1990s United States civil trainer aircraft
Low-wing aircraft
Single-engined tractor aircraft
Alarus